Bajo Stanišić (Serbian Cyrillic: Бајо Станишић; 1890–1943) was a Montenegrin Serb officer of the Royal Yugoslav Army, who was one of the participants of the Uprising in Montenegro against the Italian occupation forces in 1941. After the suppression of the uprising, he became one of the commanders of the Chetnik units in Montenegro and openly collaborated with Fascist Italy until his death in 1943.

Uprising in Montenegro 
Stanišić was a member of the Supreme Command of the insurgent forces during the Uprising in Montenegro.

Anti-communist struggle and collaboration with the Italians 
On 11 February 1942, after the uprising had been suppressed, Stanišić conducted a coup near Danilovgrad. On that occasion, two companies from the "Bijeli Pavle" detachment joined him. Later that month, he established the National Army of Montenegro and Herzegovina comprising six battalions, most of which were Chetniks, and appointed himself as their commander. On 17 February and 6 March 1942, Stanišić concluded collaboration agreements with the Italian military governor, Alessandro Pirzio Biroli. In the agreement from March of 1942, signed by Colonel Bajo Stanišić writes that "Montenegrin nationalists, regardless of the final outcome of the war, will never use weapons against Italian troops."

Stanišić commanded the Zeta Chetnik Detachment, and according to his agreement with the Italians, his detachment was responsible for the territories of Nikšić, Danilovgrad and Podgorica. His superior commander was Blažo Đukanović, but Italians alwazs had a final say regarding military. Stanišić wanted to negotiate with Partisans but Ivan Milutinović, a commander of the Partisan forces in Montenegro, did not reply to Stanišić's offer. In May of 1943, Chetniks lost control over large part of Montenegro to Yugoslav Partisans. Mihailović harshly criticized Pavle Đurišić and Stanišić for such a loss, describing Stanišić's troops as beneath criticism. Shortly before his death, Stanišić proposed that Draža Mihailović soften his position toward the separatist "Greens" in Montenegro.

Death 
In mid October 1943, General Đukanović and Stanišić with 25 of their soldiers were located at their headquarters in the Ostrog Monastery. By 14 October they were besieged by stronger Partisan units that demanded their surrender, otherwise the Partisans threatened to destroy the monastery and kill them all. After a fierce resistance, General Đukanović and 22 soldiers laid their weapons on 18 October, but Stanišić and three of his relatives decided not to give up. Stanišić was shot dead by the Partisans on 21 October, while Stanišić's relatives committed suicide.

General Đukanović and his soldiers who surrendered to the Partisans were executed on the same day. They were buried in two mass graves. In 1948, the communists built pit toilets above the graves of Đukanović and his Chetniks for the use of workers who built a railway from Nikšić to Podgorica.

Stanišić was buried in Ostrog, below the Upper Monastery. On 20 October 1945, the Yugoslav authorities excavated his bones and threw them into sinkholes around the monastery. The monks collected his bones and secretly buried them in a grave below the Upper Monastery.

Legacy 
The killing of Bajo Stanišić and Blažo Đukanović is commemorated in a song the Victory below Ostrog.

Notes

References 
 
 
 
 
 

1890 births
1943 deaths
Serbs of Montenegro
People from Danilovgrad
Montenegrin Chetnik personnel of World War II
Serbian soldiers
Serbian people of World War II
Executed military personnel
Burials at Serbian Orthodox monasteries and churches
Montenegrin collaborators with Fascist Italy
Montenegrin collaborators with Nazi Germany
Serbian nationalists